Bela of Saint Omer was a French knight, descended from a Fauquembergues family who were castellans of the eponymous castle of Saint-Omer. 

His father, Nicholas I of Saint Omer, received lands in Boeotia in the aftermath of the Fourth Crusade. He later married Margaret of Hungary, the widow of Boniface of Montferrat, Lord of Thessalonica (died 1207). It is unclear when the marriage took place: traditional accounts mention that Nicholas died already in 1212 or 1214, but F. Van Tricht dates the marriage to after 1217. 

Bela, who was named after his maternal grandfather, Béla III of Hungary, was the eldest son of the couple, and was followed by his brother William. In 1240, Bela married the sister of the Lord of Athens and Thebes, Guy I de la Roche. As part of her dowry, he received one half of Thebes as his domain. They had three sons, Nicholas II of Saint Omer (d. 1294), who succeeded in Thebes, Otho of Saint Omer (d. before 1299), and John of Saint Omer (d. 1311), who became Marshal of the Principality of Achaea.

References

Sources
 
 
 
 

1258 deaths
13th-century rulers in Europe
People from the Duchy of Athens
Year of birth unknown
Medieval Thebes
Christians of the Crusades
Saint-Omer family